The 2009 Monte-Carlo Rally, officially 77ème Rallye Automobile de Monte-Carlo was the first round of the 2009 Intercontinental Rally Challenge season. The rally took place between January 21–24, 2009 and was won by Sébastien Ogier, who was making his début in the series.

Results

Source:

References

2009
Rally
Monte Carlo Rally
Monte
Monte Carlo Rally